Publius Juventius Celsus Titus Aufidius Hoenius Severianus (AD 67– AD 130) — the son of a little-known jurist of the same name, hence also Celsus filius — was, together with Julian, the most influential ancient Roman jurist of the High Classical era.

Public life 
Celsus was presumably born in upper Italy, where the gentilicium of Juventius was common and where senatorial Juventii can also be found. In either 106 or 107, Celsus was praetor. In 114/115 he was governor of Thracia, and afterwards he became suffect consul for the nundinium of May to August 115 as the colleague of Lucius Julius Frugi. Celsus held the office of consul the second time as consul ordinarius for the year 129 with Lucius Neratius Marcellus as his colleague. He achieved the apex of a successful senatorial career when he became proconsul of Asia in 129/130.

As a jurist 
Celsus succeeded his father Juventius Celsus in the Proculian school of lawyers. He was part of the Consilium of Hadrian and helped bring about the Senatus consultum Iuventianum, which held that a good-faith possessor of an inheritance only had to yield it back inasmuch as he was enriched by it. Another dictum of his, impossibilium nulla obligatio est – impossible obligations are void – has become a core tenet of civil law.

Celsus' legal style was bold and biting. Pliny the Younger did, however, criticise his rhetorical weaknesses. Celsus' principal work was his libri digestorum 39, of which books 1-27 discussed Hadrian's edicts -- books 1-12 and 24–27 on the order of the edicts, and books 13-23 concerned legacies and wills -- while books 28-39 discussed the laws the Senate promulgated and numerous senatus consulta.

Notable  
  – Law is the art of the good and the equitable (Dig. 1, 1, 1)
  – Knowing the laws does not mean knowing their words, but their intent and purpose(Dig. 1, 3, 17)
  – It is not artful to judge or to counsel based on a snippet of the law, without taking into consideration the law in its entirety (Dig. 1, 3, 24)
  - There is no obligation to do the impossible(Dig. 50, 17, 185)
  - An action is nothing else but the right to recover by judicial process on the merits that which is owing to one (Dig. 44, 7, 51)

References

Other secondary sources 
 Ernst Diehl, "Iuventius 13", Realencyclopädie der classischen Altertumswissenschaft Bande X,2 Sp. 1362–1363.
 PIR ² I 882
 

67 births
130 deaths
1st-century Romans
2nd-century Romans
2nd-century writers
Ancient Roman jurists
Aufidii
Imperial Roman consuls
Roman governors of Thracia